Masato Sasaki may refer to:
Masato Sasaki (footballer, born 1992) (佐々木 雅人), Japanese footballer
Masato Sasaki (footballer, born 2002) (佐々木 雅士), Japanese footballer